Bronfenbrenner is an Ashkenazi surname. Notable people with the surname include:

Kate Bronfenbrenner (born 1954), American labor scholar
Martin Bronfenbrenner (1914–1997), American economist
Urie Bronfenbrenner (1917–2005), Russian-born American psychologist

Yiddish-language surnames